Rizal Memorial Colleges Broadcasting Corporation (RMCBC) is a Philippine radio network. Its main headquarters is located at Door 1C, Anda Corporate Center, F. Inigo St., Davao City. RMCBC operates a number of stations across places in Mindanao and Visayas.

Radyo ni Juan
Radyo ni Juan was the flagship network of RMCBC from 2012 to 2020, a couple of months after its founder Dodong Solis died. Radyo ni Juan Tacurong is the sole station carrying the brand with independent programming, while most of its other stations were relaunched under different management.

RMCBC Stations

AM Stations

FM Stations
Power Radio/Max FM
The following stations are operated by Christian Media Management.

Other Brands

Defunct Stations

References

Radio stations in the Philippines
Mass media companies established in 1966
Philippine radio networks